1999–2000 Hong Kong FA Cup was the 25th staging of the Hong Kong FA Cup. 

It was competed by all of the 8 teams from Hong Kong First Division League. The competition kicked off on 30 March 2000 and finished on 9 April with the final.

Happy Valley won the cup for the first time after beating Orient & Yee Hope Union by 7-2 in the final, the highest scoring final in the cup history.

Fixtures and results

Bracket

References

Hong Kong FA Cup
Hong Kong Fa Cup
Fa Cup